The River Lennon or Leannan is a river in County Donegal, Ireland.

Course

The River Lennon rises in the Glendowan Mountains and flows through Gartan Lough and Lough Fern. It continues through Kilmacrennan and enters Lough Swilly at Ramelton.

Pollution

Wildlife

The River Lennon is a noted brown trout fishery. Salmon numbers are recovering after a UDN outbreak in the 1970's. Other species found in the river (a Special Area of Conservation) include the freshwater pearl mussel, European otter and slender naiad.

See also
Rivers of Ireland

References

Rivers of County Donegal